Art Madrid (born c.1935), a La Mesa, California resident since 1958, held elective office in La Mesa from 1981 to 2014. Elected as a City Councilman from 1981 to 1990, Art was then elected Mayor of La Mesa, California in 1990 and then re-elected in 1994, 1998, 2002, 2006 and 2010. He was defeated by Mark Arapostathis in the November 2014 election.

In 1994, Mayor Madrid gained national and international attention when he started a highly successful program of publishing the names and pictures of individuals arrested for prostitution in his community.
In 1995 the American Society of Public Administrators selected Art as San Diego County's Outstanding Elected Official. San Diego Magazine selected him as one of their "50 People to watch in 2000."

Art has served as chair of the San Diego Association of Governments, SANDAG. He also serves on State Board of the League of California Cities and was President of the San Diego Division of the League. He has served as President of the California Council of Governments (CALCOG).

References

External links
San Diego Magazine website.

Mayors of places in California
1935 births
Living people